D. T. Chandrasekar (born 9 November 1992) is an Indian cricketer who plays for Tamil Nadu. He made his first-class debut on 1 October 2015 in the 2015–16 Ranji Trophy.

References

External links
 

1992 births
Living people
Indian cricketers
Tamil Nadu cricketers
Place of birth missing (living people)